Earl Cooper "Robbie" Robertson (November 24, 1910 – January 19, 1979) was a Canadian professional ice hockey goaltender who played 190 games in the National Hockey League.

Early life 
Robertson was born in Bengough, Saskatchewan. He played junior hockey with the Regina Falcons.

Career 
During his career, Robertson played with the Detroit Red Wings (1936–37 season) and New York Americans/Brooklyn Americans (1937–38 season to 1941–42 season).

During the 1937 Stanley Cup playoffs, Detroit's regular goaltender Normie Smith was injured. Robertson was called on play six games in the playoffs. Robertson was in net the day Detroit Red Wings won their second Stanley Cup in 1937, and his name is engraved on cup as a result of this win. During World War II, he served with the 19th Alberta Dragoons.

Career statistics

Regular season and playoffs

References

External links

1910 births
1979 deaths
Brooklyn Americans players
Canadian ice hockey goaltenders
Detroit Red Wings players
Ice hockey people from Saskatchewan
New York Americans players
Pittsburgh Hornets players
Springfield Indians players
Stanley Cup champions
Canadian expatriate ice hockey players in the United States